Thyrogonia efulensis is a moth in the subfamily Arctiinae. It was described by William Jacob Holland in 1898. It is found in Cameroon.

References

Endemic fauna of Cameroon
Moths described in 1898
Arctiinae